James Holmes (born 1965) is a West Midlands-born comedy actor of stage and television. He is best known for playing Clive in the 2009 BBC sitcom Miranda.

Education
Holmes trained at The Poor School in London, then did a Youth Training Scheme working in the props department of the Belgrade.

Career
Holmes has appeared in over 40 television and theatre productions since 1984. He has been featured in various off-West End and regional shows, including a run as Lady Bracknell in The Importance of Being Earnest for the New Players Theatre, and various parts in Catherine Tate's theatre comedy show. His other roles include a helpful Citizen's Advice volunteer in two episodes of the TV series Psychoville, and a performance as food critic Floyd Ackerman in Dani's House.

Holmes also played as Roy Silver alongside Penelope Keith in the BBC Radio 4 adaptation of M C Beaton's Agatha Raisin series, and played in The Bill in 2006. In 2019 he played Thomas Snell in the ghost story  Martin's Close for the BBC.

References

External links

The Poor School Acting Training and Short Courses, King's Cross, London

British male stage actors
Living people
Place of birth missing (living people)
British male film actors
British male television actors
20th-century British male actors
21st-century British male actors
Male actors from the West Midlands (county)
1965 births